Wufutang station is a station on Line 8 of the Beijing Subway. It was opened on December 30, 2018.

Station Layout 
The station has an underground island platform.

Exits 
There are 3 exits, lettered A, C, and D. Exits A and C are accessible.

References 
 Beijing Subway official map, showing official English name

Beijing Subway stations in Daxing District